Rodrigo Alves da Silva Santos (born October 4, 1984), known as Rodriguinho, is a Brazilian footballer who plays as a forward.

External links
 

Living people
1984 births
Brazilian footballers
Association football forwards
People from Campo Grande
Sportspeople from Mato Grosso do Sul